Ustad Faiyaz Khan (8 February 1886  5 November 1950) was an Indian classical vocalist, an exponent of the Agra gharana of Hindustani classical music. According to SwarGanga Music Foundation website, "By the time he died at Baroda, he had earned the reputation of being one of the greatest and most influential vocalists of the century."

Early life
Born at Sikandara in the North-Western Provinces in 1886, he was the son of Safdar Hussain, who died four months before his birth. He was brought up by his maternal grandfather, Ghulam Abbas (1825-1934), who taught him music up to the age of 25. He was also a student of Ustad Mehboob Khan "Daraspiya", his father-in-law, Natyan Khan and his uncle Fida Hussain Khan. According to an article on a music website titled, 'Great Masters of Hindustani Music', "Faiyaz Khan's musical lineage goes back to Tansen himself. His family is traced back to Alakhdas, Malukdas and then to Haji Sujan Khan (son of Alakhdas who became a Muslim)."

Singing career
Faiyaz Khan served for a long time as the court musician of Sir Sayajirao Gaekwad III, the Maharaja of Baroda, where he was awarded the "Gyan Ratna" (Gem of Knowledge). The Maharaja of Mysore awarded him the title "Aftab-e-Mausiqi" (the Sun of Music) in 1908. Faiyaz Khan's specialities were dhrupad and khyal, but he was also capable of singing thumri and ghazal. According to the well-known musicologist Dr. Ashok Ranade, who was a former Director of Music Centre, University of Bombay, "There was no chink in his armour". His most popular thumri was Baaju band khul khul jaye. 

"He was a frequent performer in the musical conferences and circles of Lucknow, Allahabad, Calcutta, Gwalior, Bombay and Mysore and in concerts organised by provincial princes." These princes often vied with one another to have the Ustad perform in their respective courts. The rulers of Baroda held him in high esteem and he was offered the seat to the right of the Maharaja of Baroda during the official functions of the royal court. He also performed at Jorasanko Thakurbari, the residential abode of Rabindranath Tagore (1861-1941), who was an admirer of the Ustad. It is known that he had held a musical session at Jorasanko a few years before the passing away of Tagore. Other well-known admirers include tabla maestros such as Ahmed Jan Thirakwa, Ustad Amir Khan, Ali Akbar Khan, Vilayat Khan and Pandit Ravi Shankar.
The Gurukul lineage
Some of his best-known students were Vidushi Dipali Nag, Dilip Chand Bedi, Sohan Singh, famous rudra veena player Asad Ali Khan, Dhruvatara Joshi, Shrikrishna Ratanjankar and Jnanendra Prasad Goswamy, apart from in-house disciples such as Khadim Hussain Khan, Vilayat Hussain Khan, Latafat Hussain Khan, Ata Hussain Khan and Sharafat Hussain Khan. Faiyaz Khan himself was an admirer of Abdul Karim Khan of Kirana gharana. S. N. Ratanjankar was perhaps the last of his pupils who excelled both as a teacher and as a performer.

Personal life
Considered a neo-classicist by some scholars of Indian classical music, Faiyaz Khan was known for his broadmindedness, kindness, humility and sudden fits of temper that cooled almost instantaneously. Simple at heart, he cared little for the gifts and rewards ("inam") that were showered upon him in almost every place he performed. His associate, a relative and a lifelong companion Ghulam Rasul accounts an incident in the 1930s when a thousand rupee currency note was still found tucked in the pocket of his sherwani (a long, collared and buttoned-down outer outfit), after it came back home after being washed, cleansed, dried and ironed by the washerman. When asked about it by Rasul, the Ustad retorted in utter innocence - "How do I know who is giving me what and how am I to know that a single currency note can be worth more than a hundred rupees?" In another incident which took place at Unaon, near Kanpur, a few years later; when the Ustad discovered that his patron was spending beyond his means to host the concert of the Ustad to celebrate the 'sacred threading ceremony' of his son, Faiyaz Khan accepted only the fare for his return journey and blessed the child with a gold ring purchased from the local goldsmith during his afternoon stroll the day before. Faiyaz Khan was a great composer who composed several bandishes using the pen-name 'Prem Piya'.

According to SwarGanga Music Foundation website, "Failing health due to a bout of typhoid in 1945 followed by tuberculosis restricted him to lower his pitch to "B" and "B Flat", though in his prime, he always sang in "C Sharp" and "C". The available recordings of the Ustad are almost entirely from his later years." According to an article on a music website titled, 'Great Masters of Hindustani Music', "He summed up in himself the finest traditions of his gharana and was its greatest exponent in recent times."

Death and tomb
Faiyaz Khan died on 5 November 1950 at Baroda, Gujarat in India. Faiyaz Khan's tomb, situated in Vadodara, Gujarat (older name of city Baroda, Gujarat ) was attacked in April 2002 due to the riots. Extensive damage was inflicted on the structure.

Discography 

 78 rpm side A Lalat Aalaap, side B 'drut' – tadapata hoon jaise jale bin meene (Hindusthan Records)
Thumri Bhairavi Baazuband khul khul jaaey, his most popular thumri

References

External links
 "Kudrat Rangibirangi" by Kumarprasad Mukhopdhyay, 1st edition.

1886 births
1950 deaths
Hindustani singers
People from Agra
20th-century Indian male classical singers
Agra gharana
Vocal gharanas
20th-century Khyal singers
Musicians in British India